Pizitz was a major regional department store chain in Alabama, with its flagship store in downtown Birmingham. At its peak it operated 12 other stores, mostly in the Birmingham area with several locations in Huntsville and other Alabama cities.

The chain was founded as the Louis Pizitz Dry Goods Co. in 1899 on the site of its flagship building in downtown Birmingham. It was sold to McRae's in December 1986, and all former Pizitz stores became McRae's. Many of the former Pizitz locations are now closed, but the Pizitz family (via Pizitz Management Group) still owns the buildings of most of its former stores. This became an issue when the McRae's chain was sold to Belk Department Stores of Charlotte, North Carolina in 2005. Louis Pizitz Middle School is built on land donated by the Pizitz family.

References

 White, Marjorie Longenecker, ed (1977) "Downtown Birmingham: Architectural and Historical Walking Tour Guide. Birmingham: Birmingham Historical Society.
 Hollis, Tim (2005) Birmingham's Theater and Retail District. Charleston, SC: Arcadia Publishing. 
 Hollis, Tim (2010) Pizitz: Your Store''. Charleston, SC: The History Press.

External links
 Pizitz memories at "Birmingham Rewound".
 View of Pizitz interior at the Birmingham Public Library Digital Collections

Defunct department stores based in Alabama
Companies based in Birmingham, Alabama
Retail companies disestablished in 1986
Retail companies established in 1899
Defunct companies based in Alabama
1899 establishments in Alabama